The Black Talon is the name of a number of supervillains appearing in American comic books published by Marvel Comics.

Publication history
Desmond Drew first appeared in Strange Tales #173 (April 1974) and was created by Gene Colan and Len Wein.

The successor to Drew named Samuel David Barone wore the same costume as the original and was an ally of the Grim Reaper, operating in the New Orleans area. He first appeared in The Avengers #152 (Oct. 1976), created by Gerry Conway and John Buscema.

Fictional character biography

Black Talon (Pascal Horta)
The first Black Talon was Pascal Horta, a painter who lost his hand in an auto accident. Undergoing experimental surgery, he was given the hand of an African-American serial killer, "Strangler Burns", who was put to death. The serial killer blood in his new hand overcame Horta's peaceful nature and drove him to commit murders. Pascal Horta first appeared in Captain America Comics #9, in 1941. He was created by Otto Binder and Jack Kirby.

Black Talon (Desmond Drew)

The second Black Talon is a voodoo priest who can create and control zombies. He wears a costume which resembles a chicken, and has an upside-down cross painted on his chest. He was a millionaire and voodoo witch doctor, and posed as a "living loa" to carry out the plans of his mother, Mama Limbo. He battled and became an enemy of Brother Voodoo. He was later exposed as an impostor, and was beaten to death by his own cultists.

Black Talon (Samuel Barone)

The third Black Talon was a professional criminal and cult leader, like the original. He resurrected Wonder Man as a zombie at the behest of the Grim Reaper and sent him to attack the Avengers. The Black Talon battled the Avengers himself, and was defeated by the Scarlet Witch. He then joined the second Lethal Legion.  With the Grim Reaper and Nekra, he battled the Vision and Scarlet Witch. Under the Grim Reaper's orders, he attempted a recreation of "Simon Williams" as a zombie. With the Man-Ape, Black Talon deserted the Lethal Legion during a battle with the West Coast Avengers.

Nekra learned the Black Talon's voodoo rites, and she later used them on two occasions to resurrect the Grim Reaper as a zombie.

When battling She-Hulk, Black Talon formed the X-Humed from the four dead mutants Changeling, Scaleface, Living Diamond and Harry Leland but was unable to control all of them at once and Changeling was able to break his hold long enough for She-Hulk to triumph.

The Black Talon has also fought Deadpool, who viciously mocked him for his chicken costume.

Black Talon returned in Marvel Zombies 4, having technically retired from supervillainy, instead becoming a secretive cocaine producer, selling to the Hood. Talon comes across the Zombie (Simon Garth) carrying the zombie head of Deadpool, and offers to sell the head to Hood.

Black Talon later appears in full supervillain gear when he uses zombies to attack Times Square as part of a revenge scheme against the Avengers. Unfortunately for him, he finds the Punisher instead. After shooting several zombies, the Punisher shoots Black Talon twice in the chest, killing him.

Black Talon later turned up alive and appeared as a member of the Shadow Council's incarnation of the Masters of Evil.

After he was attacked by Alex Wilder, Tombstone recovered and enlisted Black Talon to rescue Mr. Fish from Hell.

Black Talon later resurfaced in a small strip mall in New York where, during a Halloween walk-a-thon, he turns a group of dead senior citizens into zombies. He encounters Deadpool, who laughs when he sees an old photo of him due to the chicken head of his costume, which Talon removed. It is later revealed that Black Talon's attack on the mall was part of a plan to help his grandmother win the walk-a-thon, though his grandmother only wanted to win the race. During the battle, Black Talon's grandmother manages to convince him to stop, forcing him to retreat.

Powers and abilities
Both Desmond Drew and Samuel Barone were voodoo cult leaders who gain their powers from the manipulation of the forces of voodoo magic. Each had the ability to create and control zombies of their creation, either vocally or telepathically. However, the Black Talon cannot communicate with his zombies telepathically when they are not in his immediate vicinity.

Each Black Talon wore a costume with the trappings of various voodoo rituals, with razor-sharp taloned gloves and boots, and a ceremonial dagger.

Other versions

Howard the Duck
A different Black Talon appeared in Howard the Duck under the name Thibodaux Boudreaux.

References

External links
 World of Black Heroes: Samuel Baron/Black Talon Biography
 Marvel Directory's article on the two in-continuity Black Talons
 
 
 
 

 

Characters created by Gene Colan
Characters created by Gerry Conway
Characters created by John Buscema
Characters created by Len Wein
Marvel Comics characters who use magic
Marvel Comics supervillains